Givak or Geyuk may refer to:
 Givak-e Olya
 Givak-e Sofla

See also
 Göyük (disambiguation)